Nikolia Mamalakis is an American ballet dancer. She is currently an artist with the Boston Ballet.

Early life 
Mamalakis was raised in Boston. She began dancing at Brookline Academy of Dance and New England Movement Arts in Burlington, Massachusetts. Later, she attended the Vienna State Opera Ballet Academy in Austria, as well as at Integrarte in Massachusetts, where she studied under Erica Cornejo and Carlos Molina.

In 2017, Mamalakis competed in the Youth America Grand Prix Senior Women's division, where she proceeded to the finals.

Career 
Mamalakis joined the  American Ballet Theatre’s Studio Company in 2018. That year, she competed in the  Ballet Beyond Borders Competition, where she won the gold medal.

In 2019, she joined the Boston Ballet II in 2019. She was promoted to Artist in 2021.

References 

Boston Ballet dancers
21st-century American ballet dancers
Dancers from Massachusetts
Year of birth missing (living people)
Living people